Bali Island School (BIS) formerly "Bali International School" is an international school in Sanur, an area of Denpasar, Bali. It serves grades PreK-12 and has about 300 students. It first opened in 1986, as the Yayasan Bali International School. By 1992 it had 150 students.

Curriculum
Bali International School has the IB International Baccalaureate program from ages 3 to 18.

Student demographics
As of 1992 many students had citizenship in multiple countries, and many of them had at least one parent each who was an Indonesian. As of that year most of its students were citizens of Australia, European countries, and North American countries.

References

External links

 Bali International School

International schools in Indonesia
Schools in Bali
1986 establishments in Indonesia
Educational institutions established in 1986